John Charles "Corn" Griffin (July 24, 1911 – January 9, 1973) was an American heavyweight boxer whose career lasted from 1930 to 1936 and included the memorable June 14, 1934 TKO loss to James J. Braddock, recreated for the 2005 film Cinderella Man.

A native of Florida, Griffin was born in Blountstown, a small community which is the county seat of Calhoun County. After winning his first fight, a 1930 bout with Charles "Ranger" Pond, he turned professional in 1931 with much promise, but was KO'd by Bob Godwin in 1933.  The heavily publicized fight with Braddock in Madison Square Garden the following year was the highlight of his career and, as dramatized in Cinderella Man, had Russell Crowe (as Braddock) punching it out with Polish boxer Art Binkowski, portraying Griffin.

During his professional career he also served as a sparring partner for former world heavyweight boxing champion Primo Carnera and, following his final bout, a 1936 Fourth of July loss to Barney Brock, left the ring, working in a number of jobs and serving in the army during World War II.

After the war, Griffin became a police officer in Columbus, Georgia.  According to the August 25, 1950 issue of the Panama City News-Herald, he didn't carry the traditional policeman's club "since his old one-two sledgehammer-like fists are as good as ever, but may be not as fast".

External links

1933 publicity photograph of "CORN GRIFFIN Leading Irish Heavyweight" in a fighting stance
News article on Corn Griffin

People from Blountstown, Florida
1911 births
1973 deaths
American male boxers
Heavyweight boxers
United States Army personnel of World War II